Bengħisa Tower, originally known as Torre di Benissa and also referred to as the Red Tower, was a small watchtower in Bengħisa, limits of Birżebbuġa, Malta. It was built in 1659 as the seventh of the De Redin towers, on or near the site of a medieval watch post. An entrenchment was built around the tower in 1761, and it was armed with 10 guns. The tower was demolished by the British to clear the line of fire of the nearby Fort Benghisa in 1915.

The site of the tower and the entrenchment is now occupied by oil tanks forming part of the Malta Freeport.

References

De Redin towers
Towers completed in 1659
Demolished buildings and structures in Malta
Buildings and structures demolished in 1915
Birżebbuġa
Former towers
1659 establishments in Malta
1915 disestablishments in Malta